Elie Mbonda is a politician in Cameroon. He is also a member of the Pan-African Parliament where Elie is a member of the Health, Labor and Social Affairs Committee. While not in politics, Elie is a member of the faculty at University of Yaoundé.

See also
 List of members of the Pan-African Parliament

References

Year of birth missing (living people)
Living people
Members of the Pan-African Parliament from Cameroon
Academic staff of the University of Yaoundé